Espen Egil Hansen (born 16 October 1965) is a Norwegian newspaper editor and publisher.

He was born in Grimstad. He was assigned with the newspaper Verdens Gang from 1991 to 2013. In 2013 he was appointed editor-in-chief of the newspaper Aftenposten, and from 2015 also CEO of the newspaper. He has been board member of the Association of Norwegian Editors, board member of the International News Media Association, and chairman of the board of the online business newspaper E24.

References

1965 births
Living people
People from Grimstad
Norwegian newspaper editors
Verdens Gang people
Aftenposten editors